Margaret Rose Guzman (born 1960) is an American attorney serving as a as a United States district judge of the United States District Court for the District of Massachusetts. She previously served as a judge of the Ayer District Court in Middlesex County, Massachusetts.

Education 
Guzman initially enrolled at the University of Southern Maine for her undergraduate education, but transferred to Clark University, where she earned a Bachelor of Arts degree in 1989. She received her Juris Doctor from the Boston University School of Law in 1992.

Career 
From 1992 to 2005, Guzman served as a public defender for the Massachusetts Committee for Public Counsel Services. She was a sole practitioner in Worcester, Massachusetts, from 2005 to 2009. From 2009 to 2017, she served as a judge on Dudley District Court. In 2012, the special counsel for the Massachusetts Supreme Judicial Court noted that Guzman had acquitted all 149 defendants who appeared before her in bench trials on drunk driving charges. The report, which  did not allege judicial misconduct, called for reform of procedures to ensure that lawyers did not engage in judge shopping. She joined the Ayer District Court in 2017 and left in 2023 to become a district judge.

Federal judicial service 

On July 13, 2022, President Joe Biden nominated Guzman to serve as a United States district judge of the United States District Court for the District of Massachusetts. President Biden nominated Guzman to the seat vacated by Judge Timothy S. Hillman, who assumed senior status on July 1, 2022. On September 21, 2022, a hearing on her nomination was held before the Senate Judiciary Committee. Conservatives and law enforcement attacked the nomination, claiming that she is reflexively pro-criminal defendant and pointing out that Guzman had acquitted all 149 defendants who appeared before her in bench trials on drunk driving charges while serving as a judge on Dudley District Court. On December 1, 2022, her nomination was reported out committee by a 12–10 vote. On January 3, 2023, her nomination was returned to the President under Rule XXXI, Paragraph 6 of the United States Senate; she was renominated later the same day. On February 2, 2023, her nomination was reported out of committee by an 11–9 vote. On February 28, 2023, the Senate invoked cloture on her nomination by a 49–48 vote, with the Vice President Kamala Harris voting for the affirmative. On March 1, 2023, her nomination was confirmed by a 49–48 vote, with the vice president casting the tie breaking vote. She received her judicial commission on March 3, 2023. She is the first Hispanic judge to serve on the District Court for the District of Massachusetts.

See also 
 Joe Biden judicial appointment controversies
 List of Hispanic/Latino American jurists

References

External links 

1960 births
Living people
20th-century American women lawyers
20th-century American lawyers
21st-century American judges
21st-century American women judges
21st-century American women lawyers
21st-century American lawyers
Boston University School of Law alumni
Clark University alumni
Hispanic and Latino American judges
Hispanic and Latino American lawyers
Judges of the United States District Court for the District of Massachusetts
Massachusetts lawyers
Massachusetts state court judges
People from Worcester, Massachusetts
Public defenders
United States district court judges appointed by Joe Biden